Van Riper is a surname. Notable people with the surname include:

Charles Van Riper (1905–1994), speech therapist
Cody Van Riper (born 1994), President of the Van Riper Brotherhood 
Jacob J. Van Riper (1838–?), American lawyer and politician
Paul K. Van Riper (born 1938), retired Lieutenant General of the United States Marine Corps
Paul P. Van Riper (1916–2014), political scientist
Peter Van Riper (1942–1998), artist and musician 
Walter D. Van Riper (1895-1973), American judge and politician

Places

United States
Lozier House and Van Riper Mill, historic structures located in Midland Park, New Jersey 
Van Riper House, 1708 Bergen Dutch sandstone house in Nutley, New Jersey
Van Riper State Park, Michigan
Van Riper-Hopper House, 1786 house in Wayne, New Jersey. Now the Wayne Township Museum.

Surnames of Dutch origin